Kenneth Blaxter may refer to:

 Kenneth Blaxter (animal nutritionist) (1919–1991), British animal nutritionist
 Kenneth William Blaxter (1896–1964), British civil servant